Majure Blanks "Bill" Stribling, Sr. (November 5, 1927 – August 22, 2006) was an American football end in the National Football League for the New York Giants and the Philadelphia Eagles.  He also played one season in Canada with the Toronto Argonauts.  He played college football at the University of Mississippi and was drafted in the 21st round of the 1950 NFL Draft.

External links

1927 births
2006 deaths
People from Leake County, Mississippi
Players of American football from Mississippi
American football wide receivers
American players of Canadian football
Ole Miss Rebels football players
New York Giants players
Philadelphia Eagles players
Toronto Argonauts players